Jiří Šimánek (born October 6, 1978) is a Czech professional ice hockey player. He played with HC České Budějovice in the Czech Extraliga during the 2010–11 Czech Extraliga season.

Šimánek previously played for IHC Písek and HC Bílí Tygři Liberec.

References

External links 
 
 

1978 births
Living people
Motor České Budějovice players
Czech ice hockey forwards
Sportspeople from České Budějovice
HC Bílí Tygři Liberec players
IHC Písek players
KLH Vajgar Jindřichův Hradec players
Stadion Hradec Králové players